WNLR (1150 AM) is a radio station licensed to Churchville, Virginia, United States, broadcasting a Christian talk and teaching format to Staunton and Augusta County. WNLR is owned and operated by New Life Ministries, Inc.

History
On September 26, 1959, a partnership of four men known as the Deerfield Broadcasting Company applied with the Federal Communications Commission (FCC) for permission to build a new radio station at Deerfield, Virginia, to broadcast with 1,000 watts during daytime hours only. A construction permit was approved on September 13, 1961, and after an investment estimated at $20,000, WABH began broadcasting on March 3, 1962. To accommodate the new station, telephone service in the town had to be upgraded with new wiring. One of the four founding owners, Ralph O. Hamilton, gradually bought out the other partners in WABH by 1969; Vincent D. O'Connell and Robert Lee Dean acquired WABH in 1973. The station moved to Churchville in 1976.

In 1981, Blue Ridge Broadcasting acquired WABH from O'Connell and Dean. On June 1, the station became WNLR "New Life Radio", the first Christian radio station in the area, operated on a noncommercial basis. Blue Ridge was locally owned by Alan Carter of Staunton and Jack Ferguson of Waynesboro; Carter subsidized the station's operations for more than a decade using the profits from a voice messaging system he ran, but when a balloon payment to the former owners came due in 1992, Carter opted to sell the station to a nonprofit in order to raise the funds necessary to make the payment. He set up New Life Ministries, Inc., which began seeking donations to buy WNLR from Blue Ridge Broadcasting for $200,000. The purchase price represented a discount from Carter's investment over the preceding decade. This acquisition was completed on January 1, 1994.

In 2010, as a fundraiser, New Life Ministries built a house near Waynesboro in order to sell it and raise an estimated $20,000 to $30,000 for station operations; the ministry received loans to finance the purchase of land and construction costs, while a local construction company pledged at-cost services.

References

External links

Contemporary Christian radio stations in the United States
Radio stations established in 1962
NLR
1962 establishments in Virginia
Augusta County, Virginia